Billy RoShawn Miller (born April 24, 1977) is a retired American football tight end. He won a Super Bowl with the New Orleans Saints of the National Football League. He was drafted by the Denver Broncos in the seventh round of the 1999 NFL Draft. He played college football at Southern California and wore no. 3, which was retired with Carson Palmer.

Miller has also played for the Houston Texans, for whom he scored the first touchdown in the Texans' history, and the Cleveland Browns in his career.

Early years
Billy attended Westlake High School in Westlake Village, California from 1991-95. He was the consensus prep All-America selection at Westlake High School.  Miller hauled in 69 passes for 1,087 yards and 14 TDs as a senior, also two-year starter on Westlake’s basketball team, earning all-Marmonte league and all-Ventura County honors.

He was the national Top 100 pick by the Dallas Morning News, posting 187 career receptions for 3,017 yards and 34 scores.

Professional career
After playing for the Denver Broncos with no starts and no playing time in 2001, Billy Miller was moved to the Houston Texans in 2002. Miller became a relatively integral part of the Texans' offense, starting in 21 games in 3 years, and playing in every game. In his first year, he obtained over 600 receiving yards, while scoring 3 touchdowns. He scored the first touchdown and the first points in history for the Houston Texans.

Miller was waived by the Saints on September 10, 2008, but re-signed on September 16. He had 45 receptions for 579 yards for 2008-2009.
But before the 2009 season started, Miller blew out his Achilles tendon in an exhibition game against the Miami Dolphins, ending his football playing career. The Saints won the Super Bowl the following February.

Personal life
Miller is divorced and has two children Jaden L. Miller and Celeste H. Miller.

References

External links
New Orleans Saints bio

1977 births
Living people
Players of American football from Los Angeles
American football tight ends
USC Trojans football players
Denver Broncos players
Houston Texans players
Cleveland Browns players
New Orleans Saints players
Tampa Bay Buccaneers coaches
People from Moorpark, California
Sportspeople from Ventura County, California